The 1983 South Pacific Games, held at Apia in Western Samoa from 5–16 September 1983, was the seventh edition of the South Pacific Games.

Participating countries
Fifteen nations competed at the 1983 South Pacific Games:

Sports
Despite swimming being a compulsory sport for the South Pacific Games, there was no facility built in Apia to host swimming events in 1983. There were thirteen sports contested at the 1983 South Pacific Games:

 

 
 
 
 

 

 

 

 

 

 
 

Note: A number in parentheses indicates how many medal events were contested in that sport (where known).

Final medal table
New Caledonia topped the table ahead of hosts Western Samoa:

See also
Athletics at the 1983 South Pacific Games
Football at the 1983 South Pacific Games

Notes
 Attempts to reduce the size the games were not successful and more than 2,500 athletes took part in 1983.

 Niue competed in the soccer and rugby competitions.

 Tokelau competed in the rugby competition.

 Postage stamps depicting athletics, netball, tennis, weightlifting, boxing, soccer, golf and rugby were issued by Samoa for the 1983 South Pacific Games.

 Fiji's women's basketball team won gold in 1983.

 Bowls: Fiji won gold in the women's pairs at Apia in 1983.

 Cook Islands won the netball gold in 1983.

 The South Pacific Games Council announced in 1978 that squash would be included in the Games, and it was played in 1979, 1983, 1987, and 1991. There were four gold medals on offer in 1983, for men's and women's individual and team events. The men's individual event won by Fiji's Willie Valentine, and the women's team event won by PNG.  Fiji won silver in both men's and  women's team events.

 Women's volleyball was played at the 1983 South Pacific Games.

References

Sources

Pacific Games by year
Pacific Games
P
 
1983 in Samoa
International sports competitions hosted by Samoa
Sport in Apia
Pacific